Dumurjala Sports City (or Dumurjala Sports Complex) is a planned sports complex of 56 acres in Dumurjala, Howrah, West Bengal, India. The complex consists of an indoor stadium (Howrah Indoor Stadium) with 6000-seating capacity; outdoor grounds for football, cricket, and hockey; a swimming pool; an outdoor gym; and a public park. The complex also has two helipads.

The complex
Dumurjala Sports City is spread over an area of nearly 60 acres connected by Dumurjala Ring Road. The indoor stadium is centrally air-conditioned and has a capacity of 6000 seats. The floor is made of teak and synthetic wood. Indoor sports facilities includes courts for badminton, basketball, and volleyball, and a wrestling arena. It has two dressing rooms, a power room, a commentary box, and a guesthouse.

Outside the complex are a 90mx50m football field and a 91.4mx55m hockey field, along with another cricket ground. There is a large children's park along with a lake island and a green corner for senior citizens. There is also an outdoor gym facility. An international level outdoor stadium is also planned, with a seating capacity of around 50,000. There are two parking lots for two-wheeler vehicles and a dedicated area for four-wheelers, which is also used as bus stand.

Formation
In 1980s the Howrah Indoor Stadium was created and used for indoor game purposes. Multiple plans for making the stadium international level were proposed before 2011 but none of them were implemented. After 2011, the Howrah Improvement Trust (HIT) prepared a report for its possible expansion and township. But the plan was again cancelled and outskirts of Dumurjala mostly got occupied illegally by people for living. In 2015,  the area was given to West Bengal Housing Infrastructure Development Corporation (HIDCO), a Government of West Bengal-controlled body, to examine possible explanations and develop it under the "Theme city" project of Government of West Bengal. In 2017, two helipads were created on the vacant places which were used as playgrounds by locals. Again plans were proposed in 2018 and construction works started.

In 2018 HIDCO announced Dumurjala to be a Sports City. A meeting was held in Howrah among then state Urban Development minister Firhad Hakim, then Mayor Rathin Chakraborty and then HIDCO chairman Debashis Sen along with senior officials of HMC and KMDA at HIDCO. The meeting stated Dumurjala Stadium was to be rebuilt and more developed to meet the state level. Investors were invited CAB was given 14-acre land. Moreover, use of renewable energy, state-of-the-art solid waste management were also planned. Township projects and housing units are also planned along the road to Dalalpukur. A 14-floored shopping mall and hotel are also planned.

Controversies and protest
After the announcement and works started in 2018, multiple protest from the locals held. Dumurjala is considered to be the "Lungs of Howrah", as it is the biggest open public area in Howrah city containing many trees, flora and fauna and forests. Hundreds of people came to protests stating "Do development but not destroying environment". "Dumurjala Math Bachao Committee" was formed to obstruct the project. A case was lodged in the Kolkata High Court against the construction by advocate Imtiaz Ahmed and Sabhyasachi Chattopadhyay. The High Court announced verdict in which it ordered the state Government to show reports about the project and to explain the explanation of the allegation of "destruction of greenery".

Transport
The sports complex is situated on the side of Bholanath Chakraborty Sarani (Drainage Canal Road) or locally known as "Notun Rasta". The Kona Expressway (NH12) is also near the complex, which is an important gateway to Kolkata. Dumurjala sports complex itself have a bus stand though it is not a bus terminus. Buses for transportation junctions like Howrah, Exide, Newtown are available. Nearest rail station is Ramrajatala railway station (along Howrah line) and Padmapukur railway station (along Shalimar line), which are located 1.7 km and 1.2 km away from the complex respectively.

See also
Howrah Indoor Stadium
Belepole
Santragachi
Howrah

References

Sports complexes
Sports in Howrah